Shimako (written: 嗣麻子, 志摩子 or 志摩子) is a feminine Japanese given name. Notable people with the name include:

, Japanese playwright
, Japanese writer, tarento and pornographic director
, Japanese screenwriter and film director

Fictional characters
, a character in the light novel series Maria-sama ga Miteru
, a character in the visual novel Rewrite

Japanese feminine given names